Elliot "Tony" Macedo (born 22 February 1938) is a former professional association footballer  who played as a goalkeeper, spending nearly his whole career at Fulham. He made 346 league appearances and played a total of 391 matches in all competitions. He ended his career in 1968 after suffering a string of injuries. Born in Gibraltar, he represented the England U23s.

Career
Macedo was born in Gibraltar in 1938 of British Gibraltarian parents. Macedo joined Fulham as a youth team player in 1955. He made his debut for the first team in a match against Bristol City in December 1957. Following his debut he went on to establish himself as the club's number one goalkeeper. He was part of the side that reached the semi-final of the FA Cup in 1958 and 1962. In 1958, he played a crucial role in Fulham's successful promotion to the First Division. He played in each of Fulham's nine successive seasons in the First Division. A series of injuries - including a backpass from Tosh Chamberlain breaking his ribs - reduced his appearances towards the end of the decade. He spent one season at Colchester United, making 38 appearances, before retiring at the premature age of 31. He emigrated to South Africa, where he has lived ever since. He was considered the "finest 'keeper never to win a full England cap", if it was not for his ineligibility, having been born in Gibraltar, who did not become members of UEFA until 2013  and remained unrecognised territory by FIFA until 13 May 2016.

He is remembered as being part a series of great Fulham sides which included individuals such as George Cohen, Jim Langley, Alan Mullery, Bobby Robson, Rodney Marsh and Bedford Jezzard, as well as Fulham's greatest ever player Johnny Haynes.

Honours
Fulham
 Football League Second Division runner-up: 1958–59

References

1938 births
Living people
English footballers
England under-23 international footballers
Gibraltarian footballers
English people of Gibraltarian descent
English people of Spanish descent
Gibraltarian people of Spanish descent
Association football goalkeepers
English Football League players
National Football League (South Africa) players
Colchester United F.C. players
Fulham F.C. players
Montreal Concordia players
Durban City F.C. players
Highlands Park F.C. players
English expatriate footballers
Gibraltarian expatriate footballers
English expatriate sportspeople in Canada
Gibraltarian expatriate sportspeople in Canada
Expatriate soccer players in Canada
English expatriate sportspeople in South Africa
Gibraltarian expatriate sportspeople in South Africa
Expatriate soccer players in South Africa
British emigrants to South Africa